Carcinothrips is a genus of thrips in the family Phlaeothripidae. It is found in Australia in New South Wales, the Northern Territory, Queensland and South Australia.

Species
 Carcinothrips leai
 Carcinothrips tania

References

Phlaeothripidae
Thrips
Thrips genera